The palato-alveolar ejective affricate is a type of consonantal sound, used in some spoken languages. In some languages it is equivalent to a palatal ejective.

Features
Features of the palato-alveolar ejective affricate:

Occurrence

See also
 List of phonetic topics

Notes

References

External links
 

Affricates
Ejectives
Oral consonants
Central consonants